Maria Angélica Leão da Costa (March 12, 1931 – June 4, 2002) was a former Olympic freestyle swimmer from Brazil, who competed at one Summer Olympics for her native country. 

At 17 years old, she was at the 1948 Summer Olympics, in London, where she finished 6th in the 4×100-metre freestyle, along with Talita Rodrigues, Eleonora Schmitt and Piedade Coutinho. She also swam the 100-metre freestyle, not reaching the finals.

References

 
1931 births
2002 deaths
Brazilian female freestyle swimmers
Swimmers at the 1948 Summer Olympics
Olympic swimmers of Brazil
Swimmers from São Paulo